Thomas James Stevens (born June 24, 1987) is a Canadian actor, producer, and musician. He is best known for his role as Jason Higgins on Fox TV's Wayward Pines. Stevens regularly performs in theatre in Vancouver and received critical acclaim for his role as "Jerry" in The Zoo Story during Vancouver's 2014 Fringe Festival season. In 2016, he won a Leo Award for Best Actor in a Guest Starring Role for Wayward Pines.

Early life 
Stevens was born on June 24, 1987, in Vancouver, British Columbia. The child of a writer, Diane Stevens (née Ried) and a visual artist, David Stevens, Tom was always encouraged to nurture his creativity and began playing music and writing songs at a young age. He first began acting in high school plays and received positive responses, but succumbed to nerves before his audition to theatre school and gave up acting for several years. After a period of working jobs in the service sector, including as a janitor, Stevens felt unfulfilled and turned back to acting. He was admitted to the Theatre program at Douglas College in 2007 and graduated in 2009.

Career 

Shortly after graduating Tom secured his first paid acting job on Blue Mountain State in 2010. Stevens went on to work on numerous television and film productions across Canada, and in 2013 was cast as Eric Griffith on Hallmark Channel's Cedar Cove opposite Andie MacDowell and Dylan Neal. He reprised this role for two seasons. In 2015, Stevens was cast as Jason Higgins on Fox TV's Wayward Pines, a role for which he received his first Leo Award nomination and win. After appearing in the final two episodes of the first season, Stevens reprised the role as a main character in 2016 for the second season of Wayward Pines.

Stevens is also a singer, songwriter, and guitarist. He started and performed with Vancouver band AtomAtom from 2011 until 2013.

Personal life 

Tom Stevens has been with his wife Erika Valliere since 2011. They met playing together in rock band AtomAtom.

Filmography

References

External links

1987 births
Living people
21st-century Canadian male actors
Canadian male television actors
Male actors from Vancouver